Charlotte Bridgwood (née Dunn, 18 August 1861 – 20 August 1929) was a Canadian vaudeville performer and inventor.

Career 
Charlotte Bridgwood was president of the Bridgwood Manufacturing Company. She was an automobile enthusiast. She decided to improve Mary Anderson's manual windshield wipers, in which people had to use levers to operate the windshield wipers. Through her manufacturing company, she invented automatic windshield wipers that she called "Electric Storm Windshield Cleaner". The patent was issued in 1917, but expired in 1920, due to Bridgwood's lack of effort in commercial production. Bridgwood was not given much recognition for her designs and two years later Cadillac became the first car manufacturer to adopt the automatic wipers.

She patented the first electrically powered windshield wiper in 1917, improving previous manually-operated wipers such as the one patented by Mary Anderson in 1905. However, her wiper used rollers rather than blades and did not catch on. She was also the mother of silent screen star Florence Lawrence who followed her mother in inventing automotive accessories.

Patents 
In October 1917, Charlotte received a patent for the first automatic windshield cleaner.

References

1861 births
1929 deaths
20th-century American inventors
Women inventors
People from Hamilton, Ontario